A referendum on the status of the island was held in Puerto Rico on 23 July 1967. Voters were given the choice between being a Commonwealth, statehood or independence. The majority of voters voted for Commonwealth status, with a voter turnout of 65.9%.

The major pro-statehood party, the Partido Estadista Republicano, boycotted the referendum. As a result of its stance, several dissidents left the party to form the New Progressive Party.

Results

By municipality

References

1967 referendums
1967
1967 in Puerto Rico
Puerto Rico
Sovereignty referendums
July 1967 events in North America
Multiple-choice referendums